Connor Garden-Bachop (born 19 April 1999 in New Zealand) is a New Zealand rugby union player of Cook Islands descent who plays for the  in Super Rugby. His playing position is wing. He has signed for the Highlanders squad in 2020.

Career 
Conor Garden-Bachop attended Scots College in Wellington before joining Canterbury in the Mitre 10 Cup and subsequently Wellington in 2019. He was signed by the Highlanders in 2020 and made his debut against the Crusaders in 2021. In his first five Super Rugby games he scored three tries.

Reference list

External links
itsrugby.co.uk profile

1999 births
New Zealand rugby union players
New Zealand sportspeople of Samoan descent
New Zealand people of French Polynesian descent
New Zealand sportspeople of Cook Island descent
Living people
Rugby union wings
Bachop-Mauger family
Rugby union fullbacks
Canterbury rugby union players
Wellington rugby union players
Highlanders (rugby union) players